Tezukayama may refer to:

Tezukayama Station, a railway station in Osaka, Japan
Tezukayama University, a university in Nara, Japan
Tezukayama Gakuin University, a university in Osaka Prefecture, Japan